Jennifer Jostyn is an American actress.

Early life and education 
Born in Boston, Jostyn attended Walnut Hill School for the Performing Arts.

Career 
She has appeared in many movies since the early 1990s, including House of 1000 Corpses, The Brothers McMullen, Milo, Omega Cop, Focus, Dr. Benny, A Perfect Little Man, Rancid, and The Life Coach, a movie she also wrote and produced. Additionally, Jostyn has had various guest starring roles on television, including ER, The Drew Carey Show, Gilmore Girls, and Come to Papa. Part of her career has entailed doing work in commercials, one of the most notable of which was her role of dancing in Madonna's 1989 Like a Prayer Pepsi commercial.

Filmography

Film

Television

References

External links

American film actresses
Living people
Actresses from Boston
21st-century American women
Year of birth missing (living people)